Abshalom Jac Lahav  (born April 4, 1977) is a New York City–based artist. He is known for his series 48 Jews and The Great Americans which have been shown at museums such as Richmond Art Museum, Samuel Dorsky Museum of Art, The Oregon Jewish Museum and Jewish Museum of Florida. His painting style implements well known images of famous people in the modern contexts, but still references historical modes of painting and black-and-white photography through its use of monotone imagery. He is also the founder of the Midnight Society, an artist run curatorial project based in Brooklyn, New York.

Early life
Lahav was born in Jerusalem, Israel in 1977, to Pnina and Moshe Lahav. He lived in Israel before his parents settled in Boston, Massachusetts.  He attended undergraduate at Wesleyan University where he was a member of the Eclectic Society.

Education
In 2000, Lahav received a Bachelor of Arts degree in psychology from Wesleyan University, Connecticut. He studied painting at the School of Visual Arts and Cooper Union and received his Master of Fine Arts degree from Brooklyn College, New York in 2008 where he studied under Vito Acconci and Keith Mayerson.

Career
Lahav began his career at the Jewish Museum, New York in an exhibition entitled Art Image and Warhol Connections, showing alongside Deborah Kass, Alex Katz, and Ben Shahn, the exhibition presented works by seven artists who directly respond to Andy Warhol.

His series of paintings 48 Jews and The Great Americans employ portraiture to question basic assumptions about the relationship of historical memory and collective identity. These works have been shown in several museums across the United States. 48 Jews is a series of Warhol-esque portrait paintings of famous Jews that examines the representation of Jews in the diaspora while The Great Americans is the combination of American heroic, pop culture and history painting.

In 2008, Lahav started an experimental painting series on Anne Frank. The series questions the long afterlife of Anne Frank's portrait and explored the intersection of pop culture and art history.

His curatorial endeavors have been shown at the Spring/Break Art Show two years in a row where his project received attention from Bill Cunningham.

Selected solo exhibitions
 Koslowe Gallery, Westchester NY, 2014
 Richmond Art Museum, Richmond Indiana, The Great Americans, 2011
 Jewish Museum of Florida, Miami Florida, 48 Jews, 2010
 Oregon Jewish Museum, Portland Oregon, 48 Jews, 2009
 Jarmuschek + Partner, Berlin, Germany, 48 Jews: Selections from the Series, 2009
 Gallery 532 Thomas Jaeckel, NY, NY. The Great Americans, 2009 
 Gallery 532 Thomas Jaeckel, NY, NY. Boundless, 2009
 Esther Prangley Rice Gallery, McDaniel College's, Md, 2007

References

1977 births
People from New York City
Living people
People from Jerusalem
American contemporary painters
Painters from New York (state)
20th-century American painters
American male painters
Brooklyn College alumni
Wesleyan University alumni
Israeli emigrants to the United States
Jewish American artists
Jewish painters
21st-century American Jews
20th-century American male artists